Instruments used specially in Otolaryngology (Otorhinolaryngology, head and neck surgery) i.e. ENT are as follows:

Instrument list

Image gallery

References

Navigation Box 

Medical lists